Scot Nery's Boobie Trap is a long-running weekly live performance variety arts show in Hollywood, California. Performances are every Wednesday, featuring an average of 15 acts each week, with much adult content. Performers include musicians, ventriloquists, comedians, knife throwers, dancers, Magic Castle magicians, jugglers, acrobats and contortionists, circus acts, and other variety entertainers. Nery founded the show in 2015, and it is co-produced by Meranda Carter.

Called "a comedic whirlwind" by the Los Angeles Times, Boobie Trap was named Best Variety Arts Show in Los Angeles by Los Angeles Magazine, as well as Outstanding Variety Show by San Diego Fringe and has been named the #1 Hollywood show on TripAdvisor.

Boobie Trap has attracted celebrities among the audience, such as Emma Thompson, Mark Wahlberg, and Steve-O.

Featured Performers 
Scot Nery is a juggler, contortionist, and fire-eater, and he hosts Boobie Trap every week. On rare occasion throughout the over-200 live performances of the show, he has had a guest emcee fill-in for him, such as comedian and actor Tom Arnold, magician Justin Willman, or sword-swallower Brett Loudermilk. Performers in the show have included:

 Ventriloquist Karl Herlinger
The band Fire Leopard
 Trapeze performer Rick Andreoli
Comedian Joel Axelrod
Juggler Michael Rayner
Singer Jesse Payo
Balloon artist Dennis Forel
Magician Nathan Coe Marsh
Contortionist Bonnie Morgan
Juggler and mime Lindsay Benner
Performance artist April Hava Shenkman
Magician Kayla Drescher
Magician Carisa Hendrix
Reggie Watts from The Late Late Show with James Corden.
Aerialist Sagiv Ben Binyamin
Comedian Kristen Studard
Actress and comedian Kate Flannery
 Musician Popstar Nima

References 

Variety shows
Comedy sketches